George Joseph Bates (February 25, 1891 – November 1, 1949) was a member of the United States House of Representatives from the state of Massachusetts. Born in Salem, Massachusetts, he served in the Massachusetts House of Representatives 1918–1924. Bates was  then elected Mayor of Salem in 1924 at the age of 33. He served as mayor until 1937, at which time he was sworn in as a Republican member of the House in the 75th Congress. During World War II, he was an interventionist. After the fall of France and before the Nazi invasion of Soviet Russia, Britain was effectively fighting the Nazis alone, throughout this time period Bates was outspokenly pro-British, and he advocated aiding Britain in any way possible, in order to help in their war against the Nazis. In 1941 he was one of the few Republicans to abstain from voting on the 1941 Lend Lease Act. Bates voted in favor of arming merchant ships. Bates made good on his campaign promises and voted to increase lend-lease funding to the British military as well as food aid for British civilians during the Blitz. Bates was subsequently re-elected six times.

Bates was born in Salem, Massachusetts, the son of Annie (Burns) and Thomas F. Bates. His first immigrant ancestor was Increase Bates who migrated from Buckinghamshire, England and settled in Salem, Massachusetts in 1629. Bates died in the crash of Eastern Air Lines Flight 537 in Washington, D.C. in 1949. He was replaced in the House by his son, William Henry Bates. He was buried at St. Mary's Cemetery in Salem. Bates Elementary School in Salem is named after George J. Bates and his son.

His daughter, Carolyn (Bates) Stanton, is the maternal grandmother of comedian John Mulaney.

See also

 1918 Massachusetts legislature
 1919 Massachusetts legislature
 1920 Massachusetts legislature
 1921–1922 Massachusetts legislature
 1923–1924 Massachusetts legislature
 List of United States Congress members who died in office (1900–49)

References

External links
 
"Memorial services held in the House of Representatives of the United States, together with remarks presented in eulogy of George Joseph Bates, late a representative from Massachusetts frontispiece 1950"

Mayors of Salem, Massachusetts
Republican Party members of the Massachusetts House of Representatives
Victims of aviation accidents or incidents in the United States
Accidental deaths in Washington, D.C.
1891 births
1949 deaths
Republican Party members of the United States House of Representatives from Massachusetts
20th-century American politicians
Victims of aviation accidents or incidents in 1949